Cleopatra IV was Queen of Egypt briefly from 116 to 115 BC, jointly with her husband Ptolemy IX Lathyros. She later became queen consort of Syria as the wife of Antiochus IX Cyzicenus.

Biography

Queen of Egypt
Cleopatra IV was the daughter of Ptolemy VIII Physcon and Cleopatra III of Egypt. She was born between 138 and 135 BC. She was the sister of Ptolemy IX, Ptolemy X, Cleopatra Selene I and Tryphaena.

Cleopatra IV married her brother Ptolemy IX when he was still a prince in c. 119/118 BC. Cleopatra IV may be the mother of Ptolemy XII Auletes and Ptolemy of Cyprus, although an unnamed concubine could be the mother of these two men as well.

In c. 115 BC Cleopatra III forced Cleopatra IV and Ptolemy IX to divorce. She replaced Cleopatra IV with her sister Cleopatra Selene.

Queen of Syria and death
After her forced divorce, Cleopatra IV fled Egypt and went to Cyprus, where she married Antiochus IX Cyzicenus and brought him the army of his half brother Seleucid King Antiochus VIII Grypus of Syria, which she had convinced to follow her. Grypus fought Cyzicenus and eventually chased him to Antioch. Grypus was married to Cleopatra IV's sister Tryphaena. Tryphaena decided that Cleopatra IV should die and over the protests of her husband summoned some soldiers and had Cleopatra IV murdered in the sanctuary of Daphne in Antioch.

In his comprehensive website about Ptolemaic genealogy, Christopher Bennett also notes the possibility that Cleopatra IV, from her brief marriage to Antiochus IX Cyzicenus, may have been the mother of the later Seleucid monarch, Antiochus X Eusebes ("the Pious"). Antiochus X would go on to marry Cleopatra IV's younger sister, Cleopatra Selene, thus making him the spouse of a woman who was his stepmother (Selene married both of her sisters' widowers, Grypus and Cyzicenus, before marrying Eusebes) and perhaps his maternal aunt.

Ancestry

See also

 List of Syrian monarchs
 Timeline of Syrian history

References

External links

 Cleopatra IV, at Livius.org

112 BC deaths
2nd-century BC births
2nd-century BC Pharaohs
2nd-century BC rulers in Africa
2nd-century BC women rulers
2nd-century BC Egyptian people
Pharaohs of the Ptolemaic dynasty
Ancient Egyptian queens regnant
Cleopatra 4
Seleucid royal consorts
Female pharaohs
Remarried royal consorts
2nd-century BC Egyptian women